Pharmakon is a 2012 Albanian drama film directed by Joni Shanaj. The film was selected as the Albanian entry for the Best Foreign Language Oscar at the 85th Academy Awards, but it did not make the final shortlist.

Cast
 Klevis Bega as Branko
 Olta Gixhari as Sara
 Niko Kanxheri as Dr. Sokrat
 Vasil Goda as Sherifi
 Pano Aliu as Gjergji

See also
 List of submissions to the 85th Academy Awards for Best Foreign Language Film
 List of Albanian submissions for the Academy Award for Best Foreign Language Film

References

External links
 

2012 films
2012 drama films
Albanian drama films
Albanian-language films